Paulette Sulpice (born  as Paulette Delachat, also known as Paulette Delachat-Sulpice) is a French curler.

At the international level, she is a  silver medallist.

At the national level, she is a ten time French women's champion curler (1975, 1976, 1977, 1978, 1979, 1980, 1982, 1983, 1984, 1985).

Teams

References

External links

Living people
French female curlers
French curling champions
Date of birth missing (living people)
Place of birth missing (living people)
Year of birth missing (living people)